The relations between Bosnia and Herzegovina and North Macedonia are very good, without any open issues between them.

History of relations

Until 1991, North Macedonia and Bosnia and Herzegovina were both constituent republics of the Socialist Federal Republic of Yugoslavia. When Yugoslavia started disintegrating, North Macedonia declared independence from Yugoslavia in September 1991. Bosnia and Herzegovina declared its independence in March 1992. Diplomatic relations between the two countries were established on 12 May 1993.

EU and NATO aspirations

North Macedonia and Bosnia and Herzegovina share the common goal of accession to the European Union.

North Macedonia is a European Union candidate country since 2005 and awaits a date for the start of accession negotiations. It also met the criteria for joining NATO and became a member on March 27 2020. 

Bosnia-Herzegovina has the goal of joining NATO as well. In 2008, it signed the Stabilisation and Association Agreement with the European Union.

Diplomatic representations

 Bosnia and Herzegovina has an embassy in Skopje.
 North Macedonia has an embassy in Sarajevo.

See also 
 Foreign relations of Bosnia and Herzegovina
 Foreign relations of North Macedonia
 Accession of Bosnia and Herzegovina to the European Union 
 Accession of North Macedonia to the European Union
 Agreement on Succession Issues of the Former Socialist Federal Republic of Yugoslavia
 Bosnia and Herzegovina–NATO relations 
 North Macedonia–NATO relations
 Croatia–North Macedonia relations

References

 
North Macedonia
Bilateral relations of North Macedonia